Carolina Dybeck Happe (born July 1972) is a Swedish business executive serving as the Chief Financial Officer (CFO) of General Electric since March 2020. She is the first outsider and non-American to be appointed CFO of the company, a job that has been described as one of the toughest CFO jobs in corporate America. Prior to joining GE she has been the CFO of several global corporations including A.P. Møller – Mærsk and ASSA ABLOY.

Early life and education 
Dybeck Happe was born and raised in Stockholm, Sweden, the daughter of Sten Dybeck a Swedish businessman and entrepreneur. She holds a Master of Science in Business and Economics from Uppsala University in Sweden.

Career 
Dybeck Happe began her career at EF Education First (an international education company) in 1996 where she pursued an international career holding various positions in Russia, Switzerland and USA. In 2002 she joined the global leader in access solutions ASSA ABLOY as a regional CFO based in Berlin, Germany. In 2007 she became the EMEA CFO based in London, United Kingdom. After a stint as the Group CFO of Trelleborg (a Swedish based global engineering group) in 2011 she rejoined ASSA ABLOY in 2012 as Group CFO and Executive Vice President based in Stockholm.

In 2019 Dybeck Happe was appointed Group CFO, Executive Vice President, of A.P. Møller – Mærsk A/S (the largest shipping company in the world) based in Copenhagen, Denmark.

In November 2019 it was announced that Dybeck Happe would join General Electric as the Group CFO and Executive Vice President, a role she assumed in March 2020 and holds to the present. Since joining the company GE has undergone a financial transformation including significant deleveraging. Dybeck Happe has been recognized as a top-ranked CFO in Europe by a number of leading publications and associations.

Dybeck Happe is currently a board member of Ericsson, a Swedish telecoms equipment maker, and formerly on the Supervisory Board of E.ON a German based European electric utility company, and has previously been on the board of directors of Schneider Electric (a French based global specialist in energy management and automation).

Personal life 
Dybeck Happe is married, with two children, and lives in the Boston area. Dybeck Happe is fluent in Swedish, German, English and Polish.

References 

Swedish business executives
Uppsala University alumni
1972 births
Living people